"Slid" is the sixth single by the English electronic music band Fluke. Taken from the album Six Wheels on My Wagon the track became a club hit with the likes of Sasha and also appeared on the Sliver soundtrack.

Versions

References 

Fluke (band) songs
1993 songs